Hardinsburg is an unincorporated community in Lawrenceburg Township, Dearborn County, Indiana.

History
Hardinsburg was laid out in 1815. It was named for Henry Hardin, the original owner of the town site. A post office was established at Hardinsburg in 1820, and remained in operation until it was discontinued in 1836.

Geography

References

Unincorporated communities in Dearborn County, Indiana
Unincorporated communities in Indiana
1815 establishments in Indiana Territory
Populated places established in 1815